Seonamhaeicola algicola is a  Gram-negative, facultatively anaerobic and rod-shaped bacterium from the genus of Seonamhaeicola which has been isolated from the algae Gracilaria blodgettii.

References

Flavobacteria
Bacteria described in 2016